Podocarpus micropedunculatus is a species of conifer in the family Podocarpaceae. It is native to northern lowlands of Borneo, occurring in Brunei, Sabah and Sarawak states of Malaysia, and possibly the Indonesian portion of the island.

Podocarpus micropedunculatus is typically a small tree or shrub. It can reproduce from rhizomes.

Podocarpus micropedunculatus is typically found in the understorey of lowland Agathis forests. Other associated trees include Dryobalanops rappa and Shorea albida.

References

micropedunculatus
Endemic flora of Borneo
Flora of the Borneo lowland rain forests
Data deficient plants
Plants described in 1985
Taxonomy articles created by Polbot
Taxa named by David John de Laubenfels